Lionel Carmant is a Canadian politician, who was elected to the National Assembly of Quebec in the 2018 provincial election. He represents the electoral district of Taillon as a member of the Coalition Avenir Québec.

As Associate Minister for Health in October 2018, Carmant announced that the government will tighten the rules on cannabis consumption, including increasing the legal age to consume to 21 from 18.

References

Living people
Coalition Avenir Québec MNAs
21st-century Canadian politicians
People from Longueuil
Black Canadian politicians
Members of the Executive Council of Quebec
Year of birth missing (living people)